Lan Kham Deng (1375–1428) was the third king of the Lao state of Lan Xang. He was the oldest son of Samsenethai.

During his reign, the Hồ dynasty emperor in Vietnam requested that Lan Kham Deng send some troops to help the Vietnamese fight off the Chinese, who were attacking them during the Ming–Hồ War. Lan Kham Deng sent thousands Laotian of troops to aid the Vietnamese, but for some reason, the armies of Lan Xang turned on the Vietnamese and fought on China's side.

Eventually, Vietnam defeated China. By that time, Lan Xang's relations with Vietnam were deteriorated and total war soon broke out. The war with Vietnam caused chaos in Lan Xang followed by many attempts by royals to seize the throne.

Lan Kham Deng died in 1428 at the age of 53. He had ruled for 12 years.

Lan Kham Deng was succeeded by Prince Phommathat.

Family
Father: Sam Saen Thai - King of Lan Xang (r.1374-1416)
Mother: Queen Buvana Dhanipaya (Bua Then Fa)
Consorts and their Respective Issue:
 Queen Nang Kaeva Buma Fa (Keo Poum Fa)
 Brahma-kumara Bhumadarada (Phommathath), King of Lan Xang (r.1428–1429)
 by unknown women
 Yugandhara (Youkhon), King of Lan Xang (r.1429–1430)
 Prince Nu Kon, Prince of S'ieng Wong S'ieng Wang - Installed as ruler of Xieng Khoang in 1441

References

Kings of Lan Xang
1375 births
1427 deaths
15th-century Laotian people
15th-century monarchs in Asia
Laotian Theravada Buddhists
14th-century Laotian people